The Roman Catholic Diocese of Bafang is a Latin Catholic suffragan diocese in the ecclesiastical province of  Douala in Cameroon.

Though it is a suffragan diocese, it depends on the missionary Roman Congregation for the Evangelization of Peoples.

Its cathedral episcopal see is the Cathédrale du Cœur-Immaculé de Marie, dedicated to the Immaculate Heart of Mary, in Bafang, in the Haut-Nkam department of the West Province, Cameroon.

Statistics
As per 2014, it pastorally serves 124,193 Catholics (42.5% of 292,387 total) on 7,229 km2 in 25 parishes and 91 missions. It had 34 priests (diocesan), 11 lay religious (sisters) and 12 seminarians.

History
The diocese was established on 26 May 2012 -without a formal missionary stage- as Diocese of Bafang on territory split off from the Diocese of Nkongsamba, in the same province.

Ordinaries
Its first and only incumbent is
 Abraham Kome (26 May 2012 – ...), born 2 July 1969 in Cameroon, Ordained a priest on 11 December 1999, Consecrated Bishop on 15 July 2012.

External links and sources 
 GCatholic

Roman Catholic dioceses in Cameroon
Roman Catholic Ecclesiastical Province of Douala